Thomas Gibson Dysart (24 December 1935 – 7 June 2022) was a Scottish-born Australian actor, known for his appearances on television dramas and comedies and in character roles in films and miniseries.

Early career 
Dysart graduated from NIDA in 1959, and started his career as a vocalist and performed in theatre.

Film and TV roles
High-profile early roles included appearances in Skippy the Bush Kangaroo, Phoenix Five, and several roles in the Crawford Productions police drama series Homicide, Division 4, Matlock Police and  Cop Shop.

Dysart appeared briefly in the series Prisoner in the early 1980s, where he played what is perhaps his best-known acting role, that of vicious and cold prison officer Jock Stewart. In the storyline, after being fired from the prison service Stewart admitted to prisoner Judy Bryant that he was the one responsible for murdering her lesbian lover, fellow prisoner Sharon Gilmour. This revelation brought to a close a murder-mystery storyline in the series but launched a long-running story-arc where Bryant repeatedly escaped from prison in a succession of attempts to exact her revenge on Stewart.

After this, Dysart continued in guest-starring television roles in drama series and situation comedies, and appeared in many feature films. His films included The Man from Snowy River (1982), Bliss (1985), Garbo (1992), and Flynn (1996). Television roles of the 1990s included appearances in All Together Now, The Games, State Coroner, Blue Heelers, Something in the Air and Neighbours. He also provided the voice for Captain Griswald in Anthony Lucas' animated short film The Mysterious Geographic Explorations of Jasper Morello (2005).

Commercial advertisements
In the 1990s he appeared in a well-remembered television commercial advertisement for the Yellow Pages where he calls a series of mechanics about his problematic Goggomobil, ("G, O, G, G, O ... No! No! Not the Dart"). He was also known for playing a recurring character of a Mafia-boss-like butcher in advertisements for Don Smallgoods.

In the early 2000s he continued his Goggomobil persona advertising Shannons Insurance.  The concept played on the role of a person searching for the car parts as any car enthusiast would.  Telstra challenged this in the Supreme Court and Shannons withdrew the advertisements, but continued with Dysart and the accent (which Dysart insisted was his own and could not change).  The adverts continue and Shannons Insurance also owns several of the Goggomobil cars which feature regularly in their shows. Dysart and Joan Brockenshire appeared in Karl von Möller's 2019 documentary "D'art".

Personal life 
Dysart enjoyed a long personal and professional relationship with director and writer Frank Howson. They worked together on the films Backstage, Boulevard of Broken Dreams, What the Moon Saw, Flynn, Crime Time, The Final Stage, The Lucky Country, and the award-winning short film Remembering Nigel, which also featured Dysart's wife and son Kole.

Dysart was married to actress Joan Brockenshire. On 18 February 2022, Dysart suffered a stroke and was taken to the Alfred Hospital. He died on 7 June 2022 in Melbourne, Victoria at the age of 86.

References

External links
 
 

1935 births
2022 deaths
Australian male film actors
Australian male soap opera actors
Male actors from Melbourne
Scottish emigrants to Australia
Scottish male film actors
Scottish male soap opera actors
Scottish male television actors
20th-century Australian male actors
21st-century Australian male actors
20th-century Scottish male actors
21st-century Scottish male actors